Marlon Beresford (born 2 September 1969) is an English former footballer who played as a goalkeeper. He formerly also worked as an accountancy tutor and sports commentator after retiring from football. He is currently working for Woking FC as a goalkeeping coach.

Career

Sheffield Wednesday and early loans
Born in Lincoln, Lincolnshire, Beresford started his career in the Sheffield Wednesday youth system. He signed a professional contract in September 1987. While at the Yorkshire club, he was sent out on loan to Bury, Northampton Town twice and Crewe Alexandra.

Burnley
After failing to break into the Sheffield Wednesday first team, Beresford was sold for a fee of £95,000 to Burnley. While at Burnley he made almost 250 appearances and impressed so much that he was then tracked by Arsenal Newcastle and eventually bought by Middlesbrough

Middlesbrough and further loans
Beresford was signed to provide goalkeeping backup to Mark Schwarzer and kep 3 clean sheets in is first 3 games helping the club to promotion to the Premier League. During season 01/02 he was then loaned to Sheffield Wednesday, Wolverhampton Wanderers and Burnley for a second spell.

Later career
When his contract with Middlesbrough ended, Beresford joined York City on a short-term contract in August 2002, before joining Burnley for the third time, on a month's contract in September. Despite doubts over his proficiency, he played a whole season at Burnley. A return to York for the following season fell through due to insurance problems regarding an old back injury. He then signed for Bradford City on a free transfer in September 2003, after which he moved to Luton Town.

Luton Town, Barnsley and Oldham Athletic
Beresford impressed for Luton, becoming a fans favourite, but an FA-imposed transfer embargo which prevented the Hatters from signing him permanently. When his loan ended he moved to Barnsley but, after Luton came out of administration and had the embargo lifted, he was re-signed for Luton by Mike Newell in 2004.

Beresford played a key role in Luton's League One winning side in 2004–05 – the first time in his career he had picked up a championship winners medal. Due to his experience, he continued making appearances throughout the 2005–06 season and contributed significantly to Luton's respectable finish of 10th place. Beresford also played in the 2006–07 season which saw Luton relegated from the Championship.

Beresford spent a month on loan at Oldham Athletic between 18 October and 18 November 2007. A compromise was then reached with Luton with regard to his contract in 2008 .

Post-playing career
Marlon spent spells with the IFA as a goalkeeping coach overseeing the development of the Northern Ireland U21 U19 & U17 goalkeepers along with a coaching role at Barnet FC Barnet. He now combines his time with running a very successful accountancy training company in Belfast & Edinburgh along with being a radio summariser for BBC3 Counties following Luton Town and BBC Radio Lancs covering Burnley FC in the Premier League

In 2017 Beresford re-joined Barnet FC as Goalkeeping coach but after only 2 months he teamed up with former teammate Stephen Robinson who was appointed manager and joined Motherwell FC as their full-time Goalkeeping coach.

In the summer of 2022, Beresford joined Woking FC

Honours
Individual
PFA Team of the Year: 1992–93 Second Division, 1993–94 Second Division, 2004–05 League One

References

External links

1969 births
Living people
Sportspeople from Lincoln, England
English footballers
Association football goalkeepers
Sheffield Wednesday F.C. players
Bury F.C. players
Northampton Town F.C. players
Crewe Alexandra F.C. players
Burnley F.C. players
Middlesbrough F.C. players
Wolverhampton Wanderers F.C. players
York City F.C. players
Bradford City A.F.C. players
Luton Town F.C. players
Barnsley F.C. players
Oldham Athletic A.F.C. players
Barnet F.C. non-playing staff
Premier League players
English Football League players
Association football goalkeeping coaches